Rock most often refers to:
 Rock (geology), a naturally occurring solid aggregate of minerals or mineraloids
 Rock music, a genre of popular music

Rock or Rocks may also refer to:

Places

United Kingdom
 Rock, Caerphilly, a location in Wales
 Rock, Cornwall, a village in England
 Rock, County Tyrone, a village in Northern Ireland
 Rock, Devon, a location in England
 Rock, Neath Port Talbot, a location in Wales
 Rock, Northumberland, a village in England
 Rock, Somerset, a location in England
 Rock, West Sussex, a hamlet in Washington, England
 Rock, Worcestershire, a village and civil parish in England

United States
 Rock, Kansas, an unincorporated community
 Rock, Michigan, an unincorporated community
 Rock, West Virginia, an unincorporated community
 Rock, Rock County, Wisconsin, a town in southern Wisconsin
 Rock, Wood County, Wisconsin, a town in central Wisconsin

Elsewhere
 Corregidor, an island in the Philippines also known as "The Rock"
 Jamaica, an island in the Caribbean is locally referred to as the "Rock"
 Niue, an island near Tonga referred to as the "Rock" by residents
 Rock of Gibraltar, a British overseas territory near the southernmost tip of Spain

Multiple entities
 Rock County (disambiguation)
 Rock Creek (disambiguation)
 Rock Island (disambiguation)
 Rock Lake (disambiguation)
 Rock River (disambiguation)
 Rock Mountain (disambiguation)
 Rock Township (disambiguation)

People
 Rock (name), a list of people with the surname, first name or nickname
 Rock (rapper) (born Jamal Bush in 1975), American rapper
 Man Mountain Rock, later stage name used by professional wrestler Maxx Payne
 Rock aka Blade Runner Rock, early ring name used by The Ultimate Warrior while as a member of the Blade Runners tag team.
 The Rock, (born Dwayne Johnson in 1972), American actor and wrestler

Arts, entertainment, and media

Fictional characters
 Rock (comics), a character in the DC Comics universe
 Rock (manga), a recurring, major character in most of Osamu Tezuka's manga series
 Rock Howard, the playable character in Garou: Mark of the Wolves
 Mega Man (character), also called Rock, from the Mega Man series 
 Chuck Rock, the playable character in the 1991 self-titled side-scrolling platform video game
 Sgt. Rock, a DC Comics character

Music

Albums
 Rock (album), a 2003 nu-metal album by Pleymo
 Rocks (Aerosmith album) (1976)
 Rock (Casting Pearls EP) (2002)
 R.O.C.K., a 1986 hard rock/heavy metal album by Kirka
 Rock!!!!!, an album released by Violent Femmes in 1995
 Rocks (Harem Scarem album) (2001)
 The Cosmos Rocks, a studio album by Queen and Paul Rodgers (2008)

Songs
 "Rock" a 2017 song by hip hop artist Plies from his mixtape Ain't No Mixtape Bih 3
 "Rock", one of the tracks on Soft/Rock, a single by Lemon Jelly
 "Rocks" (song), by Primal Scream (1994)

Other uses in arts, entertainment, and media
 Rock (magazine), a former Yugoslav music magazine
 Rock, a novel by Hal Ellson
 Rocks (film), a 2019 British coming-of-age drama film
 Rocks (Das Rad), a 2001 German animated short
 Rock Records, a Taiwanese record label founded in 1980
 Uprock or rock, a form of street dance

Computing and technology
 Rock (processor), a microprocessor by Sun Microsystems
 Rocks Cluster Distribution, Linux distribution for cluster computing

Food
 Rock (confectionery), a type of stick-shaped boiled sugar confectionery
 Rock candy, also known as sugar candy or rock sugar
 Rock salmon, often referred to as rock

Slang
 Crack cocaine or rock
 Diamond, or rock
 Gemstone, or rock

Sports

Teams and leagues
 "Rocks", a nickname of the Colorado Rockies Major League Baseball team
 Toronto Rock, of the National Lacrosse League

Sports that use rocks
 Curling, a sport in which players slide a stone or rock on a sheet of ice, towards a target area which is segmented into four concentric circles
 Steinstossen, the Swiss variant of stone put, a competition in throwing a heavy stone or rock
 Stone put, a competition in throwing a heavy stone or rock
 Stone skipping (or stone skimming), the art of throwing a flat stone or rock

Other
 Rock (ski course) in China, the downhill course for the 2022 Winter Olympics

Other uses
 Alcatraz Prison, nicknamed "The Rock"
 Criminal rock throwing
 Distaff, a tool used in spinning
 Memorial Stadium (Indiana), on the Indiana University campus, also known as The Rock
 ROCK1, a human gene
 USS Rock (SS-274), a US Navy submarine
 Rock (landform), a type of islet

See also
 
 
 .rocks
 ROC (disambiguation)
 ROCK (disambiguation)
 Rockey (disambiguation)
 Rockies (disambiguation)
 Rocky (disambiguation)
 Rok (disambiguation)
 Roque (disambiguation)
 Rox (disambiguation)
 The Rock (disambiguation)